Massey Ranch Airpark  is a general aviation airport in Edgewater, Florida, United States. The airport is part of an airport community, with homes located on the airport, and hangars built next to most homes. The airport was opened in 1957 and is open to the public.

References

External links

 Official website
 Airpark Aviation Center, the local FBO
 

Airports in Volusia County, Florida
1957 establishments in Florida
Airports established in 1957